Domesticated species and the human populations that domesticate them are typified by a mutualistic relationship of interdependence, in which humans have over thousands of years modified the genomics of domesticated species. Genomics is the study of the structure, content, and evolution of genomes, or the entire genetic information of organisms. Domestication is the process by which humans alter the morphology and genes of targeted organisms by selecting for desirable traits. These genomic changes produce the domestication syndromes.

Background
Since domestication involves selection of traits over time, which leads to genetic changes, the science of genomics can identify which genes across an entire genome are altered during this intense artificial selection period. Understanding the genomics of domestication can also offer insight into the genetic effects of both the artificial, human driven selection of domestication, as well as natural selection. This makes the genomics of domestication a unique tool for examining the genetics of evolution in organisms that are relatively easy to study as their history may be more thoroughly preserved due to their usefulness to humans.

Genomics as a tool

Historically genomic studies have been focused on select organisms for which there is funding to study. Initially, when sequencing costs were prohibitive, this was limited to organisms with small genomes, such as viruses and bacteria, and then in eukaryotes, model organisms of importance to the scientific community for research.  These included the Mus musculus (the house mouse), Drosophila melanogaster (fruit fly) and Arabidopsis thaliana (Arabidopsis) genomes. One of the most prominent publicly funded genome projects was the Human Genome Project which helped to refine existing sequencing techniques as well as develop additional ones. Following these model organisms, agriculturally important species were next emphasized. As of 2009, there are more than 50 plant species whose genomes are being sequenced. However, the most important agricultural crops, including those in the grass and legume families such as rice, wheat and maize, have received the most attention and funding. As of 2005, a full sequence of the rice genome has been published. These domesticated species and in some cases, their wild ancestors, have received focus due to their agricultural and economic importance and the benefits that having a sequenced genome for these species confers such as the ability to easily identify targets for selective breeding programs to increase yield, facilitate drought tolerance, or select a variety of desirable traits.

Genetics and genomics of domestication
During domestication, crop species undergo intense selective pressures that alter their genomes. The process of selection during domestication has largely focused on core traits that have come to define domesticated species. In seed or grain crops, these hallmark traits include increases in seed size, a reduction in natural seed dispersal, reduced lateral branching, and an annual life cycle. The genes that code for these traits have been elucidated in some species, such as the maize tb1 gene, which controls for lateral branching, using classical genetic techniques as well as genomics. However, traditional Mendelian genetics which examines inheritance patterns on an individual trait basis is limited to traits or phenotypes that cleanly segregate into distinct classes.  Genomics is able to overcome this limitation through the comparison of the genomes of individuals exhibiting a trait or phenotype of interest to a reference genome which enables the identification differences between the two genomes such as single-nucleotide polymorphisms (SNP), the movement of transposable elements (or retrotransposons) or deletions, among other genetic changes.

Coding DNA
Genomics offers insight into coding DNA  as well as noncoding DNA. By comparing the sequence of a previously isolated section of chromosome 8 in rice between fragrant and non-fragrant varietals researchers were able to determine their genetic difference. The aromatic and fragrant rices, including basmati and jasmine are derived from an ancestral rice domesticate that suffered a deletion in exon 7 and as a result sequence coding for betaine aldehyde dehydrogenase (BADH2) was altered.

Noncoding DNA
However, looking solely at genes, or coding DNA, can be ineffective when examining certain traits or studying the evolution of a species during the domestication process. Genes that are vital for cellular process are often highly conserved and mutations at these locations can prove fatal. Areas of the genome that are noncoding can be prone to much higher mutation rates. Because of this, these noncoding genes provide vital information when studying the divergence of wild and domestic species. Since core genes are conserved between and among species, examining DNA sequences for these genes in multiple individuals of a species may be unable to provide much information on the diversity present in a population or species that is young. The estimated age of domesticated animal and plant species tends to be less than 10,000 years, which on an evolutionary timescale, is relatively short. Because of this, highly variable noncoding DNA, such as microsatellites, that mutate frequently, provide genetic markers with sufficient intraspecific variation to document domestication. Studying the noncoding DNA of domesticated species is made possible by genomics, which provides the genetic sequence of the entire genome, not simply coding DNA from genes of interest. In the case of coconuts, recent genomic research using 10 microsatellite loci was able to determine that there have been 2 cases of coconut domestication based on sufficient variation between individuals found in the Indian Ocean and those found in the Pacific Ocean.

Advantages of genomics over traditional genetics
Genomics offers various benefits that the study of single genes, or genetics, does not. Having a fully sequenced genome for an organism, such as potato, allows researchers to compare DNA across multiple species and examine conserved sequences. In 2011, researchers at the Potato Genome Sequencing Consortium compared a de novo potato genome to 12 other species including arabidopsis, grape, rice, sorghum, maize, poplar, and others that allowed them to isolate potato specific genes, including those that confer resistance to potato blight caused by Phytophthora infestans. The ability to predict genes of interest for crop breeding is a major advantage to the further domestication of crop species that is facilitated by genomics and the identification of genes and extragenic sequences that control for these desirable traits. Modern plant breeders can use this information to manipulate the genetics of crop species to develop new domesticated varieties with desired modern traits such as increased yield and the ability to respond better to nitrogen fertilizers. Comparative genomics also allows researchers to make inferences about the evolution of life through comparing genomic sequences and examining patterns of divergence and conservation.

Evolution
In his most famous work, Origin of Species, Charles Darwin compared natural selection to domestication  to help explain the former and he went on to write an entire book on the topic entitled The Variation of Animals and Plants Under Domestication. Domesticated species serve as ideal model systems for examining key concepts of evolution because their history is relatively short (on the evolutionary scale of billions of years) and well preserved. Additionally, by virtue of their usefulness to humans, many domesticated species are extant and available for study. The genomes of crop species have been sequenced in part to help with their improvement for agronomic reasons, but because genome data are publicly available, in many cases for free, these organisms also serve as systems for examining the effects of evolution and artificial selection on genes. In particular, the genomics of domesticated species allow for the study of strong artificial selection, founder events and bottlenecks, as well as wider evolutionary questions.

The process of domestication, by which only a choice few wild individuals are cultivated and selected against, often results in very strong selective pressures. This is evident in the genomes of these individuals as a lack of genetic diversity. In some cases this lack of diversity is seen as a selective sweep, whereby the variation at a particular locus of the genome is highly reduced while variation outside of this area is maintained or only partially reduced. In other cases, such as the coconut, genomic studies have revealed occurrences of a founder event, whereby the genetic diversity of an entire population is reduced due to a small number of individuals with low diversity being the isolated ancestors of a larger modern population. Bottlenecks, where variation is reduced throughout the entire genome, are also evident in crop species such as pearl millet, cotton, common bean and lima bean. With the identification of bottlenecks in these species, researchers are able to study the effects on an organisms' ability to evolve past a bottleneck, and what effects this may have on the genomes of both individuals and populations as well as their fitness.

Domesticated species and human history
Domesticated species and the human populations that domesticate them are typified by a mutualistic relationship of interdependence. Domesticated crop species tend to become increasingly reliant on human populations for dispersal due to the selection against natural seed dispersal methods and humans have become increasingly dependent on domesticated crop species to sustain growing populations. Because many crop species rely on humans for dispersal, and it is possible to use genomics to track the dispersal of domesticated species, the genomics of domesticated species can be used as a tool to track human movements throughout history.

Bottle gourd
The bottle gourd (Lagenaria siceraria) is a domesticated species that originated in Africa and was dispersed throughout Asia by 9000 B.C.E. and reached the Americas by 8000 B.C.E. Morphologically and genetically, the Asian and African bottle gourds are sufficiently different that they can be designated as two separate subspecies. Morphologically the American gourd resembles the African gourds more than the Asian gourds, which was previously used as support for the theory that the American variety is derived from a wild African gourd that floated across the ocean. However, in 2005 researchers with the Smithsonian Institution were able to use a combination of archeological and genomic data to show that the bottle gourds in the Americas are actually more similar to Asian gourds, which suggests that the American gourds may be derived from Asian gourds that were carried across the Bering land bridge by Paleo-Indians.

Coconut
Genomic analysis of cultivated coconut (Cocos nucifera) has shed light on the movements of Austronesian peoples. By examining 10 microsatelite loci, researchers found that there are 2 genetically distinct subpopulations of coconut – one originating in the Indian Ocean, the other in the Pacific Ocean. However, there is evidence of admixture, the transfer of genetic material, between the two populations. Given that coconuts are ideally suited for ocean dispersal, it seems possible that individuals from one population could have floated to the other. However, the locations of the admixture events are limited to Madagascar and coastal east Africa and exclude the Seychelles. This pattern coincides with the known trade routes of Austronesian sailors. Additionally, there is a genetically distinct sub-population of coconuts on the Pacific coast of Latin America which has undergone a genetic bottleneck, resulting from a founder effect; however, its ancestral population is the pacific coconut, which suggests that Austronesian peoples may have sailed as far east as the Americas.

See also
 Genetic pollution
 Genomics
 Domestication
 Domesticated plants and animals of Austronesia

References

Domesticated animal genetics
Domesticated animals
Domestication of particular species